Connor Hughes (born October 4, 1983) is a former American football placekicker. He was signed by the New Orleans Saints as an undrafted free agent in 2006. He played college football at Virginia.

Hughes has also been a member of the Pittsburgh Steelers, Philadelphia Soul, and Dallas Cowboys.

References

1983 births
Living people
Sportspeople from Newport News, Virginia
Players of American football from Virginia
American football placekickers
Virginia Cavaliers football players
New Orleans Saints players
Pittsburgh Steelers players
Rhein Fire players
Philadelphia Soul players
Dallas Cowboys players